Heinesen is a Faroese name. Notable people with the surname include:

Elin Brimheim Heinesen (born 1958), Faroese journalist
Jens Pauli Heinesen (1932–2011), Faroese writer
Knud Heinesen (born 1932, Danish politician
William Heinesen (1900–1991), Faroese writer
Zacharias Heinesen (born 1936), Faroese painter

Germanic-language surnames